The 30th Virginia Infantry Regiment was an infantry regiment raised in Virginia for service in the Confederate States Army during the American Civil War. It fought mostly in western Virginia, Kentucky, North Carolina, and Virginia.

The 30th Virginia completed its organization at Fredericksburg, Virginia, in June, 1861. Men of this unit were from Fredericksburg and the counties of Spotsylvania, Caroline, Stafford, and King George.

It was assigned to General J.G. Walker's and Corse's Brigade, and fought with the Army of Northern Virginia from the Seven Days' Battles to Fredericksburg. After serving with Longstreet at Suffolk, it was on detached duty in Tennessee and North Carolina. During the spring of 1864 the 30th returned to Virginia and saw action at Drewry's Bluff and Cold Harbor. Later it endured the hardships of the Petersburg trenches north and south of the James River and ended the war at Appomattox.

It reported 1 killed and 4 wounded at Malvern Hill and 39 killed and 121 wounded in the Maryland Campaign. Many were lost at Five Forks and Sayler's Creek, and on April 9, 1865, it surrendered with 8 officers and 82 men.

The field officers were Colonels R.M. Cary and Robert S. Chew, Lieutenant Colonels John M. Gouldin and Archibald T. Harrison, and Majors William S. Barton and Robert O. Peatross.

See also

List of Virginia Civil War units

References

Units and formations of the Confederate States Army from Virginia
1861 establishments in Virginia
Military units and formations established in 1861
1865 disestablishments in Virginia
Military units and formations disestablished in 1865